The Roman Catholic Diocese of Kara is a diocese located in the city of Kara in the Ecclesiastical province of Lomé in Togo.

History
 July 1, 1994: Established as Diocese of Kara from the Diocese of Sokodé

Leadership
 Bishops of Kara (Roman rite)
 Bishop Ernest Patili Assi (July 1, 1994 – February 16, 1996)
 Bishop Ignace Baguibassa Sambar-Talkena (November 30, 1996 - January 7, 2009)
 Bishop Jacques Danka Longa (January 7, 2009 – present), had previously been Coadjutor Bishop of the diocese (2008-2009)

Twinning
The diocese of Kara is twinned with the Diocese of Bayonne, Lescar and Oloron.

See also
Roman Catholicism in Togo

References

Sources
 GCatholic.org
 Catholic Hierarchy

External links
 https://diocesedekara2019.home.blog

Roman Catholic dioceses in Togo
Roman Catholic Ecclesiastical Province of Lomé
Christian organizations established in 1994
Roman Catholic dioceses and prelatures established in the 20th century